Francis Conway Mason (21 February 1843 in County Fermanagh – 19 June 1915 in South Yarra) was an Australian politician of Irish descent. He was a member for South Gippsland in the Victorian Legislative Assembly between 1871 and 1902, with two interruptions. He was the Speaker of the Victorian Legislative Assembly from 1897 to 1902.

Biography
Mason was born in Ireland and lived there until emigrating to Australia when he was twenty-two settling in Victoria. He was first elected to the Victorian Legislative Assembly for Gippsland South in 1871 and served for many years. While serving in the Assembly he would travel across South Gippsland on horseback accompanied by his wife to visit his constituents. 

In 1892 Mason elected as Chairman of Committees for the Legislative Assembly and served in that capacity until becoming Speaker of the House in 1897. He served as Speaker until 1902 when he lost the election for Gippsland South ending his service in the Legislative Assembly. He was later described as having been the most influential member of the House at one time, and he was described as having a genial personality which made him popular with both sides of the House in addition to having a strong knowledge of Parliamentary procedure.

After his political career Mason pursued a career as a magistrate becoming Magistrate for the Dominion of New Zealand and State of Victoria and in 1907 he became Special Magistrate under the Children's Courts Act in the Hawthorn district. He worked in Hawthorn and Camberwell courts in his magistrate career and also as the chairman of several wages boards which allowed him to use his skills as Speaker of the House to mediate wage disputes between employees and companies.

In 1915 Mason suffered a brain hemorrhage at his home in South Yarra and was unconscious when a doctor arrived and died the next day. He was survived by a wife, two sons, and two daughters.

References

1843 births
1915 deaths
Members of the Victorian Legislative Assembly
19th-century Australian politicians
20th-century Australian politicians
People from County Fermanagh
Australian people of Irish descent